Menteng Stadium was a multi-purpose stadium in Menteng, Central Jakarta, Indonesia. It was used mostly for football reserve matches and was the home stadium of Persija football team. The stadium was built in 1921 with Dutch architects F.J. Kubatz dan P.A.J. Moojen and was named Voetbalbond Indische Omstreken Sport (Viosveld).

In October 2006 the stadium was demolished and a public park called Menteng Park was built on the area by the administration of Sutiyoso, governor of Jakarta at that time. The demolition was very debatable amongst the PSSI, because minister of sports Adhyaksa Dault had not approved this action. The stadium's demolition also led to conflicts that almost disbanded Persija Jakarta.

Persija Jakarta
Defunct sports venues in Indonesia
Defunct football venues in Indonesia
Sports venues in Indonesia
Football venues in Indonesia
Sports venues in Jakarta
Multi-purpose stadiums in Indonesia
Athletics (track and field) venues in Indonesia
Football venues in Jakarta
Venues of the 1962 Asian Games
Asian Games archery venues